A deletion channel is a communications channel model used in coding theory and information theory. In this model, a transmitter sends a bit (a zero or a one), and the receiver either receives the bit (with probability ) or does not receive anything without being notified that the bit was dropped (with probability ). Determining the capacity of the deletion channel is an open problem.

The deletion channel should not be confused with the binary erasure channel which is much simpler to analyze.

Formal description 

Let  be the deletion probability, . The iid binary deletion channel is defined as follows:

Given an input sequence of  bits  as input, each bit in  can be deleted with probability . The deletion positions are unknown to the sender and the receiver.

Capacity 

The capacity of the binary deletion channel (as an analytical expression of the deletion rate ) is unknown. It has a mathematical expression. Several upper and lower bounds are known.

References

External links
 Implementation of correction for deletion channel

Coding theory